is a railway station on the Kagoshima Main Line, operated by JR Kyushu in Miyama, Fukuoka Prefecture, Japan.

Lines 
Only local services on the line stop at the station.

Layout 
The station consists of two side platforms serving two tracks. The station building is a small, modern prefabricated structure which is unstaffed and serves only to house a waiting area and an automatic ticket vending machine. Sugoca card readers are also installed at the entrance to the platform. No steps are needed to enter the station and access platform 1. The platforms are linked by a footbridge but platform 2 has a separate entrance and ramp from the road on its own side. Sugoca card readers are also installed at this entrance.

Adjacent stations

History
Japanese Government Railways (JGR) opened the station with the name  on 23 March 1935 as an additional station on the existing track of the Kagoshima Main Line. On 15 November 1942, the station name was changed to Minimi-Setaka. With the privatization of Japanese National Railways (JNR), the successor of JGR, on 1 April 1987, JR Kyushu took over control of the station.

References

External links
Minami-Setaka Station (JR Kyushu)

Railway stations in Fukuoka Prefecture
Railway stations in Japan opened in 1935